The following is a list of notable alumni from National Junior College (NJC).

Politics
 Anthea Ong (1985-1986), Former Nominated Member of Parliament (NMP), Founder of numerous social organisations
 Balaji Sadasivan (1972–1973), Senior Minister of State for Foreign Affairs and Information, Communication and the Arts
Chen Show Mao (1978-1980), Former Member of Parliament for the Aljunied GRC (Paya Lebar)
Edward Chia, Member of Parliament for Holland-Bukit Timah GRC, Founder of Timber
Gan Kim Yong (1976-1977), Minister for Trade and Industry
Ho Peng Kee (1971-1972), Former Senior Minister of State for Law and Home Affairs
Hri Kumar Nair (1983-1984), Former Member of Parliament for Bishan-Toa Payoh GRC
Lam Pin Min (1986-1987), Former Member of Parliament for Sengkang West SMC
Lee Hsien Loong (1969–1970), Prime Minister of Singapore
 Lim Swee Say (1971–1972), Former Minister for Manpower; People's Action Party (PAP) Whip; Former Secretary-General of the National Trades Union Congress
 Masagos Zulkifli (1982-1983), Minister for Social and Family Development; Second Minister for Health; Minister-in-charge of Muslim Affairs; PAP Vice-Chairman
 Matthias Yao (1973-1974), Deputy Speaker of Parliament; Former Mayor of the South East District; Former Member of Parliament for MacPherson
 Ng Eng Hen (1975-1976), Minister for Defence
 Ong Soh Khim (1987-1988), Former NMP
 S. Iswaran (1979-1980), Minister for Transport
 Sylvia Lim (1982-1983), Member of Parliament for the Aljunied GRC; Chairman of Workers' Party
 Vivian Balakrishnan (1979–1980), Minister for Foreign Affairs
Tan See Leng (1982-1983), Minister for Manpower; Second Minister for Trade and Industry
 Yeo Bee Yin (2000-2001), Malaysia's former Minister of Energy, Science, Technology, Environment and Climate Change
Zhulkarnain Abdul Rahim, Member of Parliament for Choa Chu Kang GRC (Keat Hong)

Civil and legal
 Chen Show Mao (1978-1980), Partner in the Corporate Department of international law firm Davis Polk & Wardwell and Managing Partner of their Beijing Office; advised the Agricultural Bank of China on its US$22 billion initial public offering, the second largest IPO in history
Davinder Singh (1974-1975), Former CEO of Singapore law firm Drew & Napier; Former Member of Parliament for Toa Payoh GRC, and Bishan-Toa Payoh GRC
Lawrence Khong (1969-1970), Senior Pastor of Faith Community Baptist Church
Melvyn Ong (1993-1994), Lieutenant-General, Chief of Defence Force (SAF)

Academic, business and corporate
 Ho Ching (1970-1971), CEO and executive director of Temasek Holdings; Forbes 30th "Most Powerful Women in Business" as of 2020
 Lee Hsien Yang (1975-1976), Former president and CEO of SingTel; Current Non-Executive Director and Chairman-Designate of Fraser and Neave Limited
Tan Huay Cheem (1979-1980), Director and Senior Consultant Cardiologist at National University Heart Centre, President of the Singapore Heart Foundation

Media and entertainment
 Claire Wong, Actress and director
Eelyn Kok (1995-1996), Mediacorp actress
Elvin Ng (1997-1998), Mediacorp actor and artist, model
 Jeanette Aw (1996-1997), Mediacorp actress
 Jean Tay (1992-1993), Playwright
 Namiko Chan Takahashi (1992-1993), Contemporary artist
Tung Soo Hua, Mediacorp newscaster

Others 
 Dickson Yeo (1998-1999), Singaporean spy for the People's Republic of China

References

National Junior College
National Junior College people